The Nitty Gritty Dirt Band is an American country rock band formed in 1966. The group has existed in various forms since its founding in Long Beach, California. Between 1976 and 1981, the band performed and recorded as the Dirt Band.

Constant members since the early times are singer-guitarist Jeff Hanna and drummer Jimmie Fadden. Multi-instrumentalist John McEuen was with the band from 1966 to 1986 and returned during 2001, staying 16 years, then departing again in November 2017. Keyboardist Bob Carpenter joined the band in 1977. The band is often cited as instrumental to the progression of contemporary country and roots music.

The band's successes include a cover version of Jerry Jeff Walker's "Mr. Bojangles". Albums include 1972's Will the Circle be Unbroken, featuring such traditional country artists as Mother Maybelle Carter, Earl Scruggs, Roy Acuff, Doc Watson, Merle Travis, and Jimmy Martin. A follow-up album based on the same concept, Will the Circle Be Unbroken: Volume Two was released in 1989, was certified gold, won two Grammys, and was named Album of the Year at the Country Music Association Awards.

History

1966–1969
The Nitty Gritty Dirt Band was founded around 1966 in Long Beach, California, United States, by singer-guitarist Jeff Hanna and singer-songwriter-guitarist Bruce Kunkel, who had performed as the New Coast Two and later the Illegitimate Jug Band. Trying, in the words of the band's website, to "figure out how not to have to work for a living", Hanna and Kunkel joined informal jam sessions at McCabe's Guitar Shop in Santa Monica. There they met a few other musicians: guitarist-washtub bassist Ralph Barr, guitarist-clarinetist Les Thompson, harmonicist and jug player Jimmie Fadden, and guitarist-vocalist Jackson Browne. As Nitty Gritty Dirt Band, the six men started as a jug band and adopted the burgeoning southern California folk rock musical style, playing in local clubs while wearing pinstripe suits and cowboy boots. Their first paying performance was at the Golden Bear in Huntington Beach, California.

Browne was in the band for only a few months before he left to concentrate on a solo career as a singer-songwriter. He was replaced by John McEuen on banjo, fiddle, mandolin, and steel guitar. McEuen's older brother, William, was the group's manager, and he helped the band get signed with Liberty Records, which released the group's debut album, The Nitty Gritty Dirt Band, during 1967. The band's first single, "Buy for Me the Rain", was a Top 45 success, and the band gained exposure on The Tonight Show Starring Johnny Carson, as well as concerts with such disparate artists as Jack Benny and The Doors.

A second album, Ricochet, was released later during the year and was less successful than their first. Kunkel wanted the band to "go electric", and include more original material. He left the group to form WordSalad and of the People. He was replaced by multi-instrumentalist Chris Darrow.

By 1968, the band adopted electrical instruments anyway, and added drums. The first electric album, Rare Junk, was a commercial failure, as was their next, Alive.

The band continued to gain publicity, mainly as a novelty act, making an appearance in the 1968 film For Singles Only and a cameo appearance in the 1969 musical western film Paint Your Wagon, performing "Hand Me Down That Can o' Beans". The band also played Carnegie Hall as an opening act for Bill Cosby and played in a jam session with Dizzy Gillespie.

1969–1976
The group was inactive for a six-month period after Paint Your Wagon, then reformed with Jimmy Ibbotson replacing Chris Darrow. With William McEuen as producer and a renegotiated contract that gave the band more artistic freedom, the band recorded and released Uncle Charlie & His Dog Teddy, issued in 1970. Embracing a straight, traditional country and bluegrass sound, the album included the group's best-known singles; a cover version of Jerry Jeff Walker's "Mr. Bojangles", Michael Nesmith's "Some of Shelley's Blues", and four Kenny Loggins songs including "House at Pooh Corner", the first recordings of Loggins's songs. Their version of "Mr. Bojangles" became the group's first hit, peaking at No. 9 on Billboard's all genre Hot 100 chart, with 36 weeks on the chart.

The next album, All the Good Times, released during early 1972, had a similar style.

The Nitty Gritty Dirt Band next sought to solidify its reputation as a country band when band member John McEuen asked Earl Scruggs and then Doc Watson if they would record with them. Both responded that they would. This set in motion the further addition of other artists, and with the help of Earl and Louise Scruggs, they traveled to Nashville, Tennessee, and recorded what was to become a triple album, Will the Circle Be Unbroken. Nashville stalwarts Roy Acuff, Earl Scruggs, and Jimmy Martin, country pioneer Mother Maybelle Carter, folk-blues guitarist Doc Watson, Merle Travis, Norman Blake, and others appeared on the expansive set. The title is from the song, "Will the Circle Be Unbroken (By and By)", as adapted by A. P. Carter, and reflects the album's theme of trying to tie together three generations of musicians: long-haired boys from California and older veterans of the middle American establishment. The track "I Saw the Light" with Acuff singing, was a success, and the album received two nominations for Grammy Award. Veteran fiddler Vassar Clements was introduced to a wider audience by the album, and a new career. The band also toured Japan twice soon after this period.

After the next album Les Thompson left the group, making the band a foursome. Stars & Stripes Forever was a live album that mixed old successes such as "Buy for Me the Rain" and "Mr. Bojangles" with Circle collaborations (fiddler Vassar Clements was a guest performer) and long storytelling spoken-word monologues. A studio album, Dream, was also released.

During July 1974, the band was among the headline acts at the Ozark Music Festival at the Missouri State Fairgrounds in Sedalia, Missouri. Some estimates put the crowd at 350,000 people, which would make this one of the largest music events in history. At another concert, the band opened for the rock band Aerosmith.

1976–1981: "The Dirt Band"
Jimmy Ibbotson left the band at the end of 1976, leaving Fadden, Hanna, and McEuen to add John Cable and Jackie Clark, brought in on guitar and bass. In May 1977, the Nitty Gritty Dirt Band became the first American group allowed to tour the Soviet Union playing 28 sold-out concerts, and a televised appearance that is estimated to have been watched by 145 million people. In 1977, the Nitty Gritty Dirt Band first appeared on the second season of the PBS music program Austin City Limits.

The band released its first 'greatest successes' compilation album Dirt, Silver & Gold in 1976. After that release, the band shortened its name to The Dirt Band, and the group's sound became more pop and rock oriented. Saxophonist Al Garth, drummer Merel Bregante, and bassist Richard Hathaway were also added to the lineup in 1978 and Jeff Hanna became the group's producer for a few albums.

Keyboardist Bob Carpenter (who would occasionally sit in with the band from 1975 on) contributed to their 1978 album The Dirt Band and joined the band permanently in 1980.

Albums during this period included The Dirt Band and An American Dream. The single "American Dream" with Linda Ronstadt reached No. 13 on the popular music charts. The band also appeared on Saturday Night Live in their own slot (performing the instrumental penned by McEuen, "White Russia", with Steve Martin accompanying on banjo); and again later, billed as The Toot Uncommons, backing Steve Martin on his million-selling novelty tune, "King Tut." They also played on the commercial version, recorded in Aspen earlier that year.

In 1979, Bregante left the group and drummers Michael Buono and then Michael Gardner replaced Bregante on stage with the group on tour, only to be succeeded by Vic Mastrianni in 1981. Al Garth moved on to Pure Prairie League in 1982 and later joined the Eagles’ live lineup.

The albums Make a Little Magic and Jealousy were released in 1980 and 1981, with the single "Make a Little Magic" featuring Nicolette Larson reaching the Top 25 on the pop chart. The group also performed the song on a 1980 Steve Martin television special, All Commercials, with an added comic element in which Martin lip-synced the Larson vocal for the last segment of the song.

1982–1989: Return to "Nitty Gritty"
The band returned to its original name and its country roots in 1982. With the lineup paring down to Hanna, Fadden, McEuen and Ibbotson rejoining in 1982, with Carpenter, who was not touring with the group that year,  rejoining for recording sessions in Nashville, Tennessee for the album Let's Go (May 1983), which yielded the success "Dance Little Jean" that became a Top 10 country hit. The next album, 1984's Plain Dirt Fashion had the band's first No. 1 success, "Long Hard Road (The Sharecropper's Dream)".

There were two more country No. 1's: "Modern Day Romance" (1985) and "Fishin' in the Dark" (1987), the latter of which became the band's biggest-selling single, eventually being certified platinum in 2014 despite never reaching the Hot 100. Other successful songs were "Dance Little Jean" (1983); "I Love Only You" (1984); "High Horse" (1985); "Home Again in My Heart", "Partners, Brothers and Friends", and "Stand a Little Rain" (1986); "Fire in the Sky", "Baby's Got a Hold on Me", and "Oh What a Love" (1987); "Workin' Man (Nowhere to Go)" and "I've Been Lookin'" (1988); and "Down That Road Tonight" and "When It's Gone" (1989).

Performances included the 1984 Los Angeles Olympic Games and the inaugural Farm Aid concert in Champaign, Illinois. A 20-year anniversary concert at McNichols Sports Arena in Denver, Colorado featured such guests as Ricky Skaggs, Emmylou Harris, Doc Watson, and John Prine.

John McEuen left the band at the end of 1986, replaced by Bernie Leadon, formerly of the Eagles. He was with the Nitty Gritty Dirt Band in 1987 and 1988. The band's 19th album, Hold On featured the No. 1 singles "Fishin' in the Dark" and "Baby's Got a Hold on Me." The band appeared on the Today Show and The Tonight Show in the same week, and toured Europe.  After contributing to "Workin' Band" as a musician, songwriter and lead singer on the cut "Corduroy Road", Bernie Leadon departed the band.

During 1989, Nitty Gritty Dirt Band again returned to Nashville, to record Will the Circle Be Unbroken: Volume Two. Returnees from the first Circle included Earl Scruggs, Vassar Clements, and Roy Acuff. Johnny Cash and the Carter Family, Emmylou Harris, and Ricky Skaggs joined the sessions, as did John Prine, Levon Helm, John Denver, John Hiatt, Bruce Hornsby, and former Byrds Roger McGuinn and Chris Hillman. This album won two Grammy Awards and was named Album of the Year at the Country Music Association Awards for Best Country Vocal Performance (duo or group) and the Country Music Association's Album of the Year Award in 1989.

1990–2000
As a foursome of Hanna, Fadden, Ibbotson and Carpenter, the band again toured the former Soviet Union, as well as Canada, Europe, and Japan. A 25th anniversary concert was recorded on Live Two Five in Red Deer, Alberta, produced by T-Bone Burnett.

During 1992, the band collaborated with Irish folk music's The Chieftains for the Grammy Award-winning Another Country. Other efforts included the album Acoustic, spotlighting their "wooden" sound, a duet with Karla Bonoff, "You Believed in Me" for the MCA Olympic compilation, One Voice, and a cover version of Buddy Holly's "Maybe Baby" for the Decca tribute album, Not Fade Away. The Christmas Album was released in 1997, followed by Bang! Bang! Bang! in 1999.

2000s
John McEuen rejoined the band in 2001. During 2002, Nitty Gritty Dirt Band celebrated the 30th anniversary of their landmark Will the Circle Be Unbroken with a remastered CD reissue of the 1972 album and a new compilation, Will the Circle Be Unbroken: Volume III. An album of all-new material, Welcome to Woody Creek, was released in 2004. Jimmy Ibbotson again left the band a few years later.

Also during 2004, country group Rascal Flatts released a cover of "Bless the Broken Road," which the Nitty Gritty Dirt Band had recorded on Acoustic, from 1994. Songwriters Jeff Hanna, Marcus Hummon, and Bobby Boyd won a Grammy for Best Country Song for this work in 2005.

During 2005, the band donated use of the song "Soldier's Joy" for the benefit album, Too Many Years to benefit Clear Path International's work with landmine survivors. Also in 2005, the band was recognized by the International Entertainment Buyers Association for 40 years of contributions to the music industry.

In 2009, the band released a new album, Speed of Life. Produced by George Massenburg and Jon Randall Stewart, Speed of Life is composed of a series of live, freewheeling studio recordings that purposefully avoid overproduction and demonstrate the band's collaborative spirit and spontaneity. Of the 13 tracks on Speed of Life, 11 are new songs penned by the band, and two are classic covers: Canned Heat's Woodstock hit "Going Up the Country" and Stealers Wheel's "Stuck in the Middle".

2010s
In September 2015, Nitty Gritty Dirt Band commemorated their 50th anniversary with a sold-out show at Nashville's Ryman Auditorium.  Produced for PBS by Todd Squared, the producers of Bluegrass Underground (now re-branded as The Caverns Sessions), the special debuted in March 2016 and included guests John Prine, Sam Bush, Vince Gill, Jerry Jeff Walker, Alison Krauss, Rodney Crowell, Byron House, Jerry Douglas and Jackson Browne in addition to former member Ibbotson. On September 30, 2016,  Circlin’ Back: Celebrating 50 Years,  a live CD and DVD of the PBS Special was released.  In a 2016 review, the Los Angeles Times wrote that the original release  "helped knock down barriers then separating the traditional country and rock music communities, setting the stage for the eventual emergence of what came to be known as Americana music". John McEuen announced his departure from the band in December 2017 at the conclusion of their 50th anniversary tour. In 2018, Jaime Hanna (Jeff Hanna's son) and Ross Holmes joined the band on tour, along with Jim Photoglo, who began touring with the band in 2016. Photoglo is the co-author of "Fishin' in the Dark".

2020s
In May 2022, the band released a compilation of Bob Dylan covers, Dirt Does Dylan.

Family
Jeff Hanna's and John McEuen's sons, Jaime Hanna and Jonathan McEuen, recorded for DreamWorks Records in 2005 as Hanna-McEuen.

Awards and nominations
 1984 — CMA Nomination for Instrumental Group of the Year
 1985 – CMA Nomination for Instrumental Group of the Year; ACM Nomination for Vocal Group of the Year
 1986 – CMA Nomination for Vocal Group of the Year
 1988 – CMA Nomination for Vocal Group of the Year
 1989 – CMA award for Album of the Year; Grammy award for Best Country Collaboration with Vocals; Grammy award for Best Bluegrass Recording; Grammy award for Co-producing Best Country Instrumental
 1990 – Plaque on the StarWalk in Nashville
 2002 – Grammy nominations for Best Country Vocal Performance – Duo or Group and Best Country Collaboration with Vocals
 2003 – CMA nomination for Vocal Event of the Year (NGDB with Johnny Cash); IBMA award for Best Recorded Event
 2004 – Grammy award for Best Country Instrumental (NGDB with Earl Scruggs, Randy Scruggs, Jerry Douglas and Vassar Clements)
 2015 – Colorado Music Hall of Fame induction

Members

Current members
 Jeff Hanna – vocals, guitar, washboard, percussion 
 Jimmie Fadden – drums, harmonica, percussion, vocals 
 Bob Carpenter – keyboards, accordion, keyboard bass, vocals 
 Jim Photoglo – bass, acoustic guitar, vocals 
 Jaime Hanna – guitar, vocals 
 Ross Holmes – fiddle, mandolin, vocals

Discography

The Nitty Gritty Dirt Band (1967)
Ricochet (1967)
Rare Junk (1968)
Uncle Charlie & His Dog Teddy (1970)
All the Good Times (1972)
Stars & Stripes Forever (1974)	
Symphonion Dream (1975)
The Dirt Band (1978)
An American Dream (1979)
Make a Little Magic (1980)
Jealousy (1981)
Let's Go (1983) 	
Plain Dirt Fashion	(1984)
Partners, Brothers and Friends (1985)
Hold On	(1987)
Workin' Band (1988)
The Rest of the Dream (1990)
Not Fade Away	(1992)
Acoustic (1994)
The Christmas Album	(1997)
Bang, Bang, Bang	(1999)
Welcome to Woody Creek (2004)
Speed of Life (2009)
Dirt Does Dylan (2022)

References

Further reading

External links
 Official site
 Listen or Watch from Woodsongs archived show 551
 

American country rock groups
Country music groups from California
Folk rock groups from California
Grammy Award winners
Musical groups established in 1966
Capitol Records artists
Warner Records artists
United Artists Records artists
MCA Records artists
1966 establishments in California